Each year, the Southeastern Conference (SEC), a college athletic conference whose member institutions are located primarily in the Southern part of the United States, chooses Community Service Teams of players of various sports from among its member universities. The honor goes to players in recognition of their off-the-court/off-the-field volunteering and community service activities. The Community Service Team is meant to highlight an athlete from each SEC school in a variety of sports. The SEC began this concept with a football Community Service Team in 1994, originally called the Good Works team. The recognition has expanded to other sports over the years. Like an all-conference team or an all-American team, the Community Service Team is a hypothetical team - the members won't actually get together and play a game.

The community service and volunteering the players engage in includes volunteering in schools and for local nonprofits and communities of faith, as well as in youth-focused programs at their respective universities.

2018 Winners

2018 SEC Men's Basketball Community Service Team:
 Braxton Key, Alabama
 Trey Thompson, Arkansas
 Jared Harper, Auburn
 Kevarrius Hayes, Florida
 Yante Maten, Georgia
 Dillon Pulliam, Kentucky
 Aaron Epps, LSU
 Terence Davis, Ole Miss
 Mitchell Storm, Mississippi State
 Jeremiah Tilmon, Missouri
 Khadim Gueye, South Carolina
 Grant Williams, Tennessee
 Tonny Trocha-Morelos, Texas A&M
 Djery Baptiste, Vanderbilt

SEC Women's Basketball Community Service Team:
 Ashley Williams, Alabama
 Keiryn Swenson, Arkansas
 Bria Johnson, Auburn
 Haley Lorenzen, Florida
 Mackenzie Engram, Georgia
 Makenzie Cann, Kentucky
 Raigyne (Moncrief) Louis, LSU
 Shandricka Sessom, Ole Miss
 Blair Schaefer, Mississippi State
 Sophie Cunningham, Missouri
 A'ja Wilson, South Carolina
 Mercedes Russell, Tennessee
 Anriel Howard, Texas A&M
 Kaleigh Clemons-Green, Vanderbilt

2018 SEC Women's Swim and Dive Community Service Team:
 Christina Lu, Alabama
 Chelsea Tatlow, Arkansas
 Erin Falconer, Auburn
 Hannah Burns, Florida
 Megan Kingsley, Georgia
 Ann Davies, Kentucky
 Jane MacDougall, LSU
 Payton Conrad, Missouri
 Katie Shannahan, South Carolina
 Alex Cleveland, Tennessee
 Esther González Medina, Texas A&M

2017 Winners

2017 SEC Baseball Community Service Team:
 Mike Oczypok, Alabama
 Alex Gosser, Arkansas
 JJ Shaffer, Auburn
 Alex Faedo, Florida
 Keegan McGovern, Georgia
 Storm Wilson, Kentucky
 Jared Poche', LSU
 Thomas Dillard, Ole Miss
 Andrew Mahoney, Mississippi State
 Nolan Gromacki, Missouri
 Wil Crowe, South Carolina
 Eric Freeman, Tennessee
 Cason Sherrod, Texas A&M
 Collin Snider, Vanderbilt

2017 SEC Football Community Service Team:
 Minkah Fitzpatrick, Alabama
 Frank Ragnow, Arkansas
 Daniel Carlson, Auburn
 Johnny Townsend, Florida
 Aaron Davis, Georgia
 Jacob Hyde, Kentucky
 John David Moore, LSU
 Javon Patterson, Ole Miss
 Gabe Myles, Mississippi State
 Anthony Hines, Missouri
 Spencer Eason-Riddle, South Carolina
 Kyle Phillips, Tennessee
 Koda Martin, Texas A&M
 Tommy Openshaw, Vanderbilt

2017 SEC Gymnastics Community Service Team:
 Aja Sims, Alabama
 Heather Elswick, Arkansas
 Kullen Hlawek, Auburn
 Grace McLaughlin, Florida
 Morgan Reynolds, Georgia
 Sidney Dukes, Kentucky
 Sydney Ewing, LSU
 Becca Schugel, Missouri

2017 SEC Women's Tennis Community Service Team:
 Erin Routliffe, Alabama
 Sasha Shkorupeieva, Arkansas
 Kourtney Keegan, Florida
 Caroline Brinson, Georgia
 Morgan Chumney, Kentucky
 Joana Valle Costa, LSU
 Anastasia Rentouli, Mississippi State
 Bea Machado Santos, Missouri
 Rachel Rohrabacher, South Carolina
 Sadie Hammond, Tennessee
 Eva Paalma, Texas A&M
 Georgina Sellyn, Vanderbilt

2017 SEC Soccer Community Service Team:
 Maddy Anzelc, Alabama
 Hannah Neece, Arkansas
 Kristen Dodson, Auburn
 Courtney Douglas, Florida
 Summer Burnett, Georgia
 Jada Holmes, Kentucky
 Lily Alfeld, LSU
 Courtney Carroll, Ole Miss
 Rhylee DeCrane, Mississippi State
 Kelsey Dossey, Missouri
 Jackie Schaefer, South Carolina
 Maya Neal, Tennessee
 Haley Pounds, Texas A&M
 Gabrielle Rademaker, Vanderbilt

2017 SEC Softball Community Service Team:  
 Sydney Littlejohn, Alabama
 Parker Pockington, Arkansas
 Kasey Cooper, Senior, Auburn
 Kayli Kvistad, Florida
 Maeve McGuire, Georgia
 Shannon Smith, Kentucky
 Elyse Thornhill, LSU
 Miranda Strother, Ole Miss
 Alexis Silkwood, Mississippi State
 Kirsten Mack, Missouri
 Macey Webb, South Carolina
 Megan Geer, Tennessee
 Celena Massey, Texas A&M2017 SEC Track and Field Community Service Team:
 Steven Gayle, Alabama
 Quanesha Burks, Alabama
 Eric Janise, Arkansas
 Taliyah Brooks, Arkansas
 Xavier Coakley, Auburn
 Marshay Ryan, Auburn
 Marques Burgman, Florida
 Emily Chapman, Florida
 Bryan Kamau, Georgia
 Mary Terry, Georgia
 Noah Castle, Kentucky
 Amy Hansen, Kentucky
 LaMar Bruton, LSU
 Nataliyah Friar, LSU
 Payton Moss, Ole Miss
 Mercedes Mattix, Ole Miss
 Curtis Thompson, Mississippi State
 Leah Lott, Mississippi State
 Taylor Stephen, Missouri
 Hannah Thomas, Missouri
 Ryan Bermudez, South Carolina
 Maya Evans, South Carolina
 Drew Kelley, Tennessee
 Cassie Wertman, Tennessee 
 Robert Grant, Texas A&M
 Madalaine Stulce, Texas A&M
 Skyler Carpenter, Vanderbilt2017 SEC Volleyball Community Service Team''':
 Cidavia Hall, Alabama
 Kelly O'Brien, Arkansas
 Macy Reece, Auburn
 Ann-Lorrayne Bzoch, Florida
 Kendall Kazor, Georgia
 Darian Mack, Kentucky
 Cheyenne Wood, LSU
 Caroline Adams, Ole Miss
 Kanani Price, Mississippi State
 Ali Kreklow, Missouri
 Courtney Furlong, South Carolina
 Erica Treiber, Tennessee
 Amy Houser, Texas A&M

Past winners
 Makeba Alcide
 Garrett Chisolm
 Rotnei Clarke
 Peter Dyakowski
 Mustapha Heron
 Malcolm Mitchell
 Nerlens Noel
 Jacob Tamme
 Tyler Wilson

See also
 Walter Payton NFL Man of the Year Award (football)
 Allstate AFCA Good Works Team
 Bart Starr Award (football)
 Arthur Ashe Courage Award
 NBA Community Assist Award (basketball)
 J. Walter Kennedy Citizenship Award (basketball)
Laureus Sport for Good Award
 List of volunteer awards

References